Zaghdraiya (also Zeghdrâya, Zoghedraya, Zghedraia. Arabic: زغدرايا) is a town in the South Governorate in Lebanon.  It is located southeast of Sidon. The village is bordered with a number of villages/towns like Darb es Sim, Maghdouche, Miye ou Miye. It has a very small population and is mainly formed of very few houses and a lot of agricultural space.

The word Zaghdraiya means "castle" or "fortress" possibly due to the fact that the village is surrounded by hill tops in almost every direction.

History 
In 1875, Victor Guérin found it to be a village of 150 Metualis, who planted figs and olives in the environment.

The town saw many struggles between its political party branches of various militias during the Lebanese Civil War

Demographics 
The town has very little inhabitants that are of a variety of religions that include Shiites as well as Melkite Catholics and Maronite Catholics as it shares borders with villages that are of Christian and Shi'a Majority.

A good portion of the town's population hold university degrees and work as doctors, nurses, lawyers, teachers, engineers including many of which have travelled abroad and went on to become very successful at their jobs. Others work in the public and governmental sector and a vast majority take good interest in maintaining and taking care of their crops and the town's agriculture. Many of the natives that went on to live elsewhere return on holidays/weekends to take care and see their lands.

Sights 

The town is mostly an agricultural landscape with a lot of olive, lemon, fig, orange, loquat (Akkidenia), and green almond trees. the town produces a lot of grapes, green beans, and jujubes. The Siniq river passes through the village and is usually the source of irrigation of these crops.

The town overlooks a vast array of the hills of southern Lebanon due to it being predominantly uninhabited landscapes and rarely any tall buildings. Inhabitants also have a view of the Our Lady of Mantara and part of Maghdouche from the village as well as a view of the Mediterranean Sea.

References

Bibliography

 

Populated places in Sidon District
Shia Muslim communities in Lebanon